Cale Hooker (born 13 October 1988) is a former professional Australian rules footballer, who played for the Essendon Football Club in the Australian Football League (AFL).

Hooker graduated from Applecross Senior High School and played for East Fremantle in the WAFL.

In 2009 and 2010 Hooker established himself as one of the club's key-position defenders. In 2011 Hooker made a good  start to the season but tore a hamstring in round 13 and played only one further game for the season. During the trade period after the 2012 season Essendon contemplated trading Hooker to the West Coast Eagles. However, Hooker, who had a year to run on his contract, declined to be traded.

In 2014 Hooker was Essendon's most reliable backman, coming second in the W.S. Crichton Medal and winning All-Australian selection for the first time.

In 2015 Hooker was elevated to Essendon's Leadership Group. He started the year in defence but was switched to the forward line halfway through the season. He became a useful goal scorer and finished the season with 21 goals. He was awarded the W. S. Crichton Medal as Essendon's best and fairest.

Hooker is noted for his marking ability and took in excess of 150 marks in each of 2013, 2014 and 2015.

Hooker, along with 33 other Essendon players, was found guilty of using a banned performance-enhancing substance, thymosin beta-4, as part of Essendon's sports supplements program during the 2012 season. He and his teammates were initially found not guilty in March 2015 by the AFL Anti-Doping Tribunal, but a guilty verdict was returned in January 2016 after an appeal by the World Anti-Doping Agency. He was suspended for two years which, with backdating, ended in November 2016; as a result, he served approximately fourteen months of his suspension and missed the entire 2016 AFL season. The suspension sparked speculation that Hooker would leave Essendon as a free agent, but he signed a new five-year contract with Essendon in April 2016, rejecting larger offers from several other clubs.

On 17 August 2021, Hooker announced that he would retire at the end of this season.

Statistics
  ''Statistics are correct to the end of round 5, 2017.'

|- style="background-color: #EAEAEA" 
! scope="row" style="text-align:center" | 2008
| || 26 || 2 || 0 || 0 || 3 || 17 || 20 || 7 || 1 || 0.0 || 0.0 || 1.5 || 8.5 || 10.0 || 3.5 || 0.5
|- 
! scope="row" style="text-align:center" | 2009
| || 26 || 16 || 3 || 3 || 72 || 173 || 245 || 74 || 53 || 0.2 || 0.2 || 4.5 || 10.8 || 15.3 || 4.6 || 3.3
|- style="background-color: #EAEAEA" 
! scope="row" style="text-align:center" | 2010
| || 26 || 18 || 2 || 1 || 81 || 174 || 255 || 71 || 39 || 0.1 || 0.1 || 4.5 || 9.7 || 14.2 || 3.9 || 2.2
|-
! scope="row" style="text-align:center" | 2011
| || 26 || 13 || 0 || 0 || 99 || 99 || 198 || 66 || 20 || 0.0 || 0.0 || 7.6 || 7.6 || 15.2 || 5.1 || 1.5
|- style="background-color: #EAEAEA" 
! scope="row" style="text-align:center" | 2012
| || 26 || 17 || 0 || 2 || 149 || 125 || 274 || 95 || 28 || 0.0 || 0.1 || 8.8 || 7.4 || 16.1 || 5.6 || 1.6
|-
! scope="row" style="text-align:center" | 2013
| || 26 || 22 || 2 || 0 || 197 || 198 || 395 || 151 || 44 || 0.1 || 0.0 || 9.0 || 9.0 || 18.0 || 6.9 || 2.0
|- style="background-color: #EAEAEA" 
! scope="row" style="text-align:center" | 2014
| || 26 || 23 || 0 || 0 || 240 || 182 || 422 || 170 || 35 || 0.0 || 0.0 || 10.4 || 7.9 || 18.4 || 7.4 || 1.5
|-
! scope="row" style="text-align:center" | 2015
| || 26 || 22 || 21 || 21 || 235 || 154 || 389 || 157 || 49 || 0.7 || 0.9 || 10.7 || 7.2 || 17.8 || 7.4 || 2.3
|- style="background-color: #EAEAEA" 
! scope="row" style="text-align:center" | 2016
| || 26 || 0 || — || — || — || — || — || — || — || — || — || — || — || — || — || —
|-
! scope="row" style="text-align:center" | 2017
| || 26 || 20 || 41 || 26 || 155 || 139 || 55 || 25 || 7 || 1.8 || 0.6 || 7.0 || 4.0 || 11.0 || 5.0 || 1.4
|- class="sortbottom"
! colspan=3| Career
! 153
! 69
! 56
! 1111 
! 1142 
! 2253 
! 816 
! 276 
! 0.3 
! 0.2 
! 8.1 
! 8.3 
! 16.3 
! 5.9 
! 2.0
|}

Notes

References

External links

Living people
1988 births
Essendon Football Club players
Bendigo Football Club players
All-Australians (AFL)
Australian rules footballers from Western Australia
People educated at Applecross Senior High School
Crichton Medal winners
Doping cases in Australian rules football